Marcelo Carrera (born 1 October 1962) is an Argentine retired footballer who played both indoor and outdoor soccer in the United States for the nearly a dozen teams.

Player
Carrera began his professional career when he signed with Once Unidos at the age of fifteen.  In 1986, he signed with the New York Express, an expansion team in Major Indoor Soccer League.  The Express withdrew from the league after 26 games and folded during the season.  He then moved to the Canton Invaders in the American Indoor Soccer Association.  He played two seasons with the Invaders.  In 1988 played the summer outdoor season with the Fort Lauderdale Strikers of the American Soccer League.  He played three seasons with the Strikers; the 1990 season in the American Professional Soccer League.  He signed with the Dallas Sidekicks in the fall of 1990.  Carrera played only one season with the Sidekicks.  In 1991, he moved to the Tampa Bay Rowdies in the APSL.  In 1992, he signed with the Chicago Power in the National Professional Soccer League.  He moved to the Canton Invaders in 1993 and remained with the team until traded to the Buffalo Blizzard at the end of the 1995–1996 season.  In addition to playing the indoor winter seasons in the NPSL, Carrera returned to outdoor soccer in 1993 with the Strikers and the New York Centaurs in the A-League in 1995.  In February 1996, the Columbus Crew selected Carrera in the 10th round (91st overall) in the 1996 MLS Inaugural Player Draft.  On November 12, 1997, he signed on loan with the Cleveland Crunch, playing nineteen games.  He also played the 1999–2000 season with the St. Louis Ambush.

Coach
In 1999, he became an assistant coach with Hoban High School in Akron, Ohio.  He held that position until 2000.  In 2000, he returned to the Crew as an assistant coach for one season.  From 2000 to 2008, he was a staff coach with Boca United S.C. in Canton, Ohio.  In 2006, he was named as a coach of the Canton Crusaders of the American Indoor Soccer League.  However, the Crusaders never played a game.

References

External links
Player profile at Dallas Sidekicks
Career stats

1962 births
Living people
American soccer coaches
American Soccer League (1988–89) players
American Professional Soccer League players
A-League (1995–2004) players
American Indoor Soccer Association players
Argentine expatriate footballers
Argentine expatriate sportspeople in Canada
Argentine expatriate sportspeople in the United States
Argentine footballers
Buffalo Blizzard players
Canton Invaders players
Chicago Power players
Columbus Crew players
Dallas Sidekicks (original MISL) players
Expatriate soccer players in the United States
Fort Lauderdale Strikers (1988–1994) players
Club Atlético Independiente footballers
Talleres de Córdoba footballers
Argentine Primera División players
Major Indoor Soccer League (1978–1992) players
Major League Soccer players
New York Centaurs players
New York Express players
National Professional Soccer League (1984–2001) players
Footballers from Buenos Aires
St. Louis Ambush (1992–2000) players
Tampa Bay Rowdies (1975–1993) players
Association football forwards